The 2018 season was Kashima Antlers's 26th consecutive season in the J1 League since professional football was established in Japan in 1993. In addition to the domestic league, the club also competed in the Emperor's Cup, J.League Cup, and AFC Champions League. They won the latter trophy securing their first ever Champions League trophy in their first appearance in the final.

Squad
The Kashima Antlers squad for the 2018 season.

Out on loan

Competitions

J1 League

League table

Matches

Emperor's Cup

Second round

Third round

Fourth round

Quarter-final

Semi-final

J.League Cup

Quarter-final

Kashima Antlers won 4–2 on aggregate.

Semi-final

Yokohama F. Marinos won 4–3 on aggregate.

AFC Champions League

Group stage

Round of 16

Kashima Antlers won 4–3 on aggregate.

Quarter-final

Kashima Antlers won 5–0 on aggregate.

Semi-final

Kashima Antlers won 6–5 on aggregate.

Final

References

External links
 J.League official site

Kashima Antlers
Kashima Antlers seasons
Kashima